The Filipino Community Center, or "FilCom Center", in Waipahu, Leeward Oahu; is a tribute to the visionary spirit of the Filipino American community in Hawaii. The FilCom Center sits on a  parcel of land gifted by the AmFac Corporation.

It has three stories of rental space, offices for social, health care services, entrepreneurial, business incubation, and technology center are housed with the FilCom Center. Intergenerational needs, services for the elderly, youth and family are its main focus.

The FilCom Center aims to actively pursue its mission of nurturing and preserving the customs and culture of the Filipino community of Hawaii. It continues to develop and provide educational, social, cultural, and economic services for the community.

The FilCom Center is the largest Filipino community center outside the Philippines.

History 
In 1991, the Filipino Chamber of Commerce of Hawaii initiated the FilCom Center during Anacleto Alcantra's term as president. The FilCom's first president and vice president were Roland Casamina and Eddie Flores, respectively. Its executive committee consisted of community volunteers. In June 2002, the FilCom center was formally inaugurated.

Donors 
The FilCom center is a tax-exempt, non-profit organization that was built through donations. At the top of its donor list are Harry and Jeannette Weinberg, the City of Honolulu, the Department of Commerce, the State of Hawaii, and the VA Housing and Urban Development.

See also
Little Manila

External links
The Filipino Community Center
eFil: Filipino Digital Archives and History Center of Hawaii
Philippine Consulate General in Honolulu

Filipino-American history
Filipino-American culture in Hawaii